Kostabi is a surname. People with that name include:

 Heino Kostabi (1933–2021), Estonian politician
 Mark Kostabi (born 1960), American artist and composer, brother of Paul
 Paul Kostabi (born 1962), American artist, musician, music producer and audio engineer, brother of Mark

See also
 Kostabi World Trade Center, a proposed building by Mark Kostabi
 

Estonian-language surnames